It's the Geography That Counts is a 1957 play by Australian writer Raymond Bowers.

Premise 
Marshall Arnitt is a racing car driver who has spent the weekend with his mother in the south of England. His foster brother James has borrowed Marshall's car without permission and hits a cyclist on the Scottish border.

Marshall decides to take the blame. But then James hears that their mother has been murdered, and Marshall has engineered clues so that James will take the fall.

Original Play
It premiered in St James Theatre in London in June 1957 in a production starring John Gregson, that actor's first appearance on stage in six years. It would be the last production held at St James Theatre

Original Cast
John Gregson as Marshal Armitt
John Stratton as James Armitt
Jane Griffiths as Mercia
Liam Redmond as Hurst
Jack Hedley as Daniels
Michael Duffield as Parker

Reception
Variety said "Too much talk and an over-complication of plot mar this otherwise ingenious whodunit. Basically It is a good dramatic story, but the first half consists practically of an involved duolog, with the first real punch Coming at halftime... a good play doctor could streamline this first' effort of a Fleet Street newspaperman, and it could be improved if skilfully adapted to the screen."

The London Times said it "looks to have the necessary staying power... the result is dryly entertaining."

Variety said the production was a financial failure.

"My first aim is to make money," Bowers said in 1957. "To do that you have to entertain. If I have any philosophising to do, I'll leave it until I'm well established."

Other Adaptations
It was adapted for Australian radio in 1958 as The Man in Question.

1961 British TV Adaptation - Listen James
It was filmed by the BBC in 1961 as Listen James.

The Times called it "as engaging and effective a piece of mystification as we have been offered for some time... it is a puzzle and not a play of character."

1960 Australian TV Play

The play was adapted for Australian television in 1960.  Filmed in Melbourne, it was directed by Chris Muir, who said "all the clues are contained in the dialogue, but it is cleverly concealed. It will be a fairly tough test for the amateur detectives."

It is unclear if the program was broadcast outside Melbourne.

The ABC later filmed In Writing (1961), also from a script by Bowers.

Cast
Marie Redshaw as Marcia
Keith Eden as Marshall Amitt, a racing driver
Kenneth Goodlet as Inspector Hurst
Marie Redshaw as Mercia Sparling
Brian Burton as Det-Sgt Daniels
William Lloyd as Parker

References

External links
1962 radio adaptation at Internet Archive

Complete copy of BBC play version

1957 plays
1960 television plays
1960s Australian television plays
Australian plays